Claude Parfaict, (Paris, c.1701 – 26 June 1777) was an 18th-century French  theatre historian.

François Parfaict's younger brother, Claude had for theatre the same passion as his brother. Claude's most notable works were collaborations with François, including Histoire du théâtre françois depuis son origine jusqu’à présent (15 volumes, 1734-1749) and Dictionnaire des théâtres de Paris (7 volumes, 1756). He also undertook on his own a Dramaturgie générale, ou Dictionnaire dramatique universel, a project that he did not implement.

Through protection by Madame de Pompadour, Claude Parfaict obtained a twelve-hundred-livres pension from which he benefited until his death. The , who had the Lettre au public, sur la mort de MM. de Crébillon (fils), Gresset, et Parfaict printed in 1777, later added an essay against the actors, entitled Il est temps de parler, and said it was by Parfaict. Nothing proves its authenticity and reading that piece raises suspicion that Coudray composed it himself.

But the Lettre d'Hippocrate sur la prétendue folie de Démocrite, was indeed translated from Greek by Claude Parfaict, 1780, in-12.

Notes

Sources 
 Joseph-François Michaud, Louis-Gabriel Michaud, Paris, Michaud frères, 1811 edition: vol. 32 (1822), (p. 563-4); 1843 edition: vol. 32, p. 133.

18th-century French dramatists and playwrights
French translators
18th-century French historians
Theatre in France
Writers from Paris
Year of birth missing
1777 deaths